NASA Orbital Debris Observatory (NODO) was an astronomical observatory located in the Lincoln National Forest near Cloudcroft, New Mexico approximately  northeast of Alamogordo.  From 1995 to 2002 it hosted two telescopes funded and operated by NASA that were dedicated to detecting orbital debris.  The facility was initially called the Cloudcroft Electro-Optical Research Facility when it was completed in 1962, and was also known as the Cloudcroft Observatory. It is now privately owned by Embry-Riddle University.

Telescopes 

 The NASA-LMT was a  aperture liquid-mirror telescope located in NODO's main dome. It consisted of a 3 m diameter parabolic dish that held  of a highly reflective liquid metal, mercury, spinning at a rate of 10 rpm, with sensors mounted above on a fixed structure. Due to the primary mirror's material, the NASA-LMT was configured as a zenith telescope. Using 20 narrowband filters, it cataloged space debris in Earth's orbit. The telescope was initially completed in 1994 at NASA's Johnson Space Center, and moved to Cloudcroft the following year, where it operated routinely until June 2002. The LMT was also used for the UBC-NASA Multi-Narrowband survey, which examined galaxies at moderate redshifts. When it was retired, some of the components were used in the  Large Zenith Telescope in British Columbia.  
 The  CCD Debris Telescope (CDT) was a portable Schmidt camera equipped with a 512×512 pixel charge-coupled device (CCD) sensor. It operated at NODO from October 1997 until December 2001, and was used to characterize debris at or near geosynchronous orbit. It had previously operated at Rattlesnake Mountain Observatory and the Air Force Maui Optical and Supercomputing observatory. The CDT was donated to Embry–Riddle University after deactivation.

Gallery

See also
List of astronomical observatories
List of largest optical reflecting telescopes
List of largest optical telescopes in the 20th century
ESA Space Debris Telescope

References

External links
 Orbital Debris Program Office at NASA
 Large Zenith Telescope homepage

Astronomical observatories in New Mexico
Buildings and structures in Otero County, New Mexico
Liquid mirror telescopes
Defunct astronomical observatories
Space debris
1995 establishments in New Mexico
2002 disestablishments in New Mexico